Chlamys is a genus of small scallops, marine bivalve molluscs in the family Pectinidae.  The name is taken from the Ancient Greek, χλαμΰς or Chlamys, a cloak worn by soldiers.

Species 

 Chlamys albida (R. Arnold, 1906) – white scallop
 Chlamys australis Sowerby, 1844
 Chlamys behringiana (Middendorff, 1849) – Bering scallop
 Chlamys bruei (Payraudeau, 1826)
 Chlamys circularis (Sowerby, 1835)
 Chlamys consociata (E. A. Smith, 1915)
 Chlamys dichroa (Suter, 1909)
 Chlamys dieffenbachi (Reeve, 1853)
 Chlamys distorta
 Chlamys farreri (Müller, 1776)
 Chlamys gemmulata (Reeve, 1853)
 Chlamys hastata (G. B. Sowerby II, 1842) – spear scallop, spiny scallop
 Chlamys islandica (Müller, 1776) – Iceland scallop
 Chlamys jordani Arnold, 1903 – Jordan scallop
 Chlamys kincaidi Oldroyd, 1929
 Chlamys kiwaensis Powell, 1933
 Chlamys liocymatus (Dall, 1925)
 Chlamys lioicus (Dall, 1907)
 Chlamys lowei (Hertlein, 1935) – Lowe scallop
 Chlamys muscosus Wood, 1828
 Chlamys navarcha Dall, 1898
 Chlamys opercularis (Linnaeus, 1758)
 Chlamys pseudislandica MacNeil, 1967
 Chlamys rubida (Hinds, 1845) – reddish scallop
 Chlamys septemradiatus
 Chlamys strategus
 Chlamys subsulcata (Locard, 1898)
 Chlamys sulcata (O. F. Mueller, 1776)
 Chlamys swifti Bernardi, 1858
 Chlamys taiaroa Powell, 1952
 Chlamys tigerina
 Chlamys varia (Linnaeus, 1758)
 Chlamys venustus
 Chlamys wainwrightensis
 Chlamys zelandiae (Gray, 1843)
 Chlamys zeelandona (Hertlein, 1931)

References 

 
 Powell A. W. B. (1979), New Zealand Mollusca, William Collins Publishers Ltd, Auckland, New Zealand 

 
Bivalve genera